Carlos Andrei Parra Miranda is a former professional Mexican footballer, who last played for Murciélagos.

References

External links

Televisa Deportes Profile

1992 births
Living people
People from Sinaloa
Mexican footballers
Mexico youth international footballers
Liga MX players
Ascenso MX players
Santos Laguna footballers
Atlético San Luis footballers
Association football forwards